The 2011 Kehoe Cup was an inter-county and colleges hurling competition in the province of Leinster. The competition is ranked below the Walsh Cup and features second and third tier counties from Leinster, Ulster, Connacht and selected university teams.

Kehoe Cup

Preliminary round

First round

Quarter-finals

Semi-finals

Final

Kehoe shield
The Kehoe Shield was also held for the third time in 2011. Participating teams consisted of those teams knocked out of the preliminary and first rounds of the Kehoe Cup.

Semi-finals

Final

References

Kehoe Cup
Kehoe Cup